Mornay may refer to:

Surnames
 Charles-Edgar de Mornay
 Philippe de Mornay
 Rebecca De Mornay

Place
Mornay, Saône-et-Loire, a commune in the French region of Bourgogne

Other
Mornay sauce